Code Lyoko (full title: Code Lyoko: Get Ready to Virtualize; sometimes mislabeled as Code Lyoko: Quest for Infinity) is the first video game based on the French animated television series Code Lyoko, published by The Game Factory and released in 2007.

Plot 
The game follows the same story as its corresponding series. Four ordinary high school students, Jeremie Belpois, Odd Della Robbia, Ulrich Stern, and Yumi Ishiyama, must help a virtual humanoid named Aelita to stop the evil artificial intelligence XANA from attacking Earth by traveling to the virtual world, Lyoko. It is mainly based on the first and second seasons, with minor twists. The last chapter in the game features a glimpse of the third season's premiere episode, but with a lot of changes.

Gameplay 

The game features both side-scrolling and 3D gameplay, reflecting the two animation styles of the series. In the real world, side-scrolling gameplay is used, resembling that used in traditional role-playing games.

On Lyoko, gameplay consists of third-person fighting, utilizing the special abilities of each character to defeat monsters and solve puzzles. There are a total of 15 chapters, divided into various side-scrolling or 3D levels.

Reception 

Code Lyoko received "mixed" reviews according to the review aggregation website Metacritic. The game was praised for its accuracy to the show and detailed graphics, while being criticized for its poor combat feature and overall game repetition.

See also
 Code Lyoko: Quest for Infinity
 Code Lyoko: Fall of X.A.N.A.

References

External links
 Code Lyoko at GamersHell.com, featuring gameplay trailers and screenshots
 

2007 video games
Action role-playing video games
Nintendo DS games
Nintendo DS-only games
Code Lyoko
Video games developed in Canada
Video games based on animated television series
Video games about parallel universes
The Game Factory games
Single-player video games
DC Studios games